Amboli is a hill station in south Maharashtra, India. At an altitude of  it is the last hill station before the coastal highlands of Goa.

Amboli lies in the Sahayadri Hills of Western India, one of the world's "Eco Hot-Spots" and it abounds in unusual flora and fauna. However, as in the other parts of the Sahaydri Hills, denudation of the forest cover and unregulated government-assisted development are gradually ruining an once-pristine environment.

Historically, Amboli village came into being as one of the staging posts along the road from Vengurla port to the city of Belgaum, which was extensively used by the British to supply their garrisons in south and central India.

The source of the Hiranyakeshi river lies in the hills around Amboli village, and an ancient Shiva temple (called Hiranyakeshwar) sits at the cave where the water emerges. The main attraction for tourists is the incredibly-high rainfall (7 m average, per year) and the numerous waterfalls and mist during the monsoons. Legend has it that there are 108 Shiva temples in and around Amboli, of which only a dozen have been uncovered, one as recently as 2005.
Amboli is also well know for sending large number of youngsters to serve Indian Army. In Amboli, it is hard to find a house which doesn't have at least one person who is serving in Indian Army or has served Indian Army. Shahid Soldier Pandurang Mahadev Gawade, was also from Amboli, who attained martyrdom while fighting five Lashkar terrorists at Drug Mulla village in Kashmir's Kupwara district on May 22, 2016, was posthumously awarded Shaurya Chakra on the eve of 68th Republic Day. Additionally, the interesting fact of the village is that many men had also served for British army in the pre-independence era.

Transport
Amboli is well connected by road to the surrounding cities of Kolhapur, Belgaum , and Panjim by road, and the nearest airport is at Belgaum Airport.

Accommodation
There are a few hotels at Amboli. Most of them provide hot water baths and have facilities like restaurant, room service and cab services.

Local transport
The only local transport is motorised three-wheeler rickshaws and a couple of private taxis.

Tourist attractions
There are in total 8 places that are listed by Maharashtra Tourism Development Corporation (MTDC).
Amboli Waterfall, Hiranyakeshi(Shiv Mandir and ancient cave), Kavalesat (Reverse waterfall point), Amboli Forest (Rich with flora and fauna),
Ganesh Kond(waterway/river), and the entire area is full of greenery and beautiful sceneries. People at the village are highly dependent on farming for daily livelihood, as a results, entire village is surrounded by rice plantation during the rainy season. People are very simple and helpful. Similarly, Amboli has several hotels and resorts but it is preferable to stay with locals and try local cuisine.

Nearest cities
 Sawantwadi - 
 Kudal- 
 Kolhapur -  via the Gadhinglaj-Sankeshwar main road
 Sangli -  via the Gadhinglaj-Chikodi-Miraj
 Belgaum - 
 Ajara- 
 Chandgad - 
 Gadhinglaj -

Nearest railway stations
 Sawantwadi Road railway station - 
 Kudal railway station - 
 Pernem railway station - 
 Belagavi railway station - 
 Chhatrapati Shahu Maharaj Terminus - 
 Miraj Junction railway station - 
 Madgaon Junction railway station - 
Tourists coming from Mumbai, Goa, Delhi and trains on the Konkan railway can reach Amboli from Sawantwadi railway station. There are buses from Karnataka State Road Transport Corporation and Maharashtra State Road Transport Corporation that travel frequently between Belgaum and Sawantwadi via Amboli. Private cars are available from Sawantwadi railway station to Amboli. Buses travel to Amboli from Sangli and Kolhapur stations via Nippani–Gadhinglaj–Ajara.

Gallery

External links

Information page
Map of Amboli Hill Station

Cities and towns in Sindhudurg district
Tourist attractions in Sindhudurg district